Adam DeGraide (born September 20, 1971) is an American business executive involved in the digital marketing and entertainment industries. He is the co-founder of four software & digital marketing companies, an independent record label and an independent film company. He produced the movie short Most, with William Zabka.

Business career

Anthem Software 

After a 3rd successful business exit, DeGraide began his fourth software & digital marketing company, Anthem Software, in Orlando, Florida. Anthem is a software & digital marketing company assisting the local small business grow their business through business management software & digital marketing.

Crystal Clear Digital Marketing 

In 2013,
 DeGraide began his third software & digital marketing company, Crystal Clear Digital Marketing, in Orlando, Florida. Crystal Clear is a digital marketing company assisting the local healthcare provider in Internet Marketing. DeGraide successfully completed the sale of Crystal Clear to Patient Now in November 2020 and immediately went on to start his 4th software and marketing company Anthem Business Software, LLC dedicated to helping small businesses.

Astonish Results 

In early 2006, DeGraide co-founded Astonish Results. The company provided digital marketing and training services for independent insurance agencies in the U.S. In 2011, Astonish Results received an undisclosed amount of equity investment from investor Serent Capital to further develop Astonish Results' growth, tools, and services. After being rebranded as Intygral in March 2015, the company was then acquired by Zywave in July 2015 and has since been absorbed.

Astonish Entertainment 

In May 2005 DeGraide founded Astonish Entertainment, also known as Astonish Records.  He signed four rock artists: No More Kings with whom he used to play bass, Aranda, Soular, Dirt Poor Robins, and pop singer David Martin.

BZ Results 

In 1997, DeGraide began his first company, BZ Results, in Providence, Rhode Island.  BZ is a digital marketing company assisting car dealers in Internet marketing. The company was acquired in 2006 by Automatic Data Processing for $125 million.

Elected Positions 

Disabled Veterans Insurance Careers elected Adam DeGraide to its strategic board. In 2006, DeGraide launched Astonish, which was previously ranked 267th on the Inc. 500 list of fastest-growing private companies in the U.S. and served more than 7,000 insurance industry users.

References 

American chief executives
1971 births
Living people